An Earth-grazing fireball (or Earth grazer) is a fireball, a very bright meteor that enters Earth’s atmosphere and leaves again. Some fragments may impact Earth as meteorites, if the meteor starts to break up or explodes in mid-air. These phenomena are then called Earth-grazing meteor processions and bolides. Famous examples of Earth-grazers are the 1972 Great Daylight Fireball and the Meteor Procession of July 20, 1860.

Overview 

As an Earth-grazer passes through the atmosphere its mass and velocity are changed, so that its orbit, as it re-enters space, will be different from its orbit as it encountered Earth's atmosphere.

There is no agreed-upon end to the upper atmosphere, but rather incrementally thinner air from the stratosphere (~50 km), mesosphere (~85 km), and thermosphere (~690 km) up to the exosphere (~10,000 km) (see also thermopause). For example, a meteoroid can become a meteor at an altitude of 85–120 km above the Earth.

Known Earth-grazing fireballs 

An Earth-grazing fireball is a rarely measured kind of fireball caused by a meteoroid that collides with the Earth but survives the collision by passing through, and exiting, the atmosphere.  four grazers have been scientifically observed.

 Meteor procession of July 20, 1860
 Meteor procession of February 9, 1913 led to conclusions a temporary satellite capture of Earth had broken up
 1972 Great Daylight Fireball, August 10, 1972, US19720810 at 15 km/s above United States and Canada (first scientific observation). It was estimated to have lost about half its mass, and 800 m/s of velocity during the encounter.
 October 13, 1990, a 40 kilogram, 41.5 km/s meteoroid passed at 97.9 km above Czechoslovakia (first orbit calculation based on photographic records from two distant places).
 March 29, 2006, fireball passed 18.8 km/s through the atmosphere 71.4 km above Japan
 August 7, 2007, EN070807 passed through the atmosphere over Europe with an orbit belonging to the rare Aten asteroid type
 June 10, 2012, an Earth-grazing fireball from the Daytime ζ-Perseid shower passed over Spain, travelling 510 km in the atmosphere. It was the faintest Earth-grazing meteor reported in the scientific literature and the first one belonging to a meteor shower.
 December 24, 2014, a slow moving Christmas Eve fireball SPMN241214 passed over north Africa, Spain, and Portugal, travelling about 1,200 km in the atmosphere.
 July 7, 2017, the Desert Fireball Network observed a grazing fireball that traveled over 1300 km through the atmosphere above Western Australia and South Australia. The closest approach was about 58.5 km, and the initial mass is estimated to be a minimum of ~60 kg. The meteoroid came from an Apollo-type orbit, and due to the close encounter with the Earth, it was sent onto a Jupiter-family comet-like orbit.

See also

References

External links 

 Fireball of 1860 (painting)
 Fireball of 1972 (photo)

Meteoroids
Observational astronomy
Atmospheric entry